Bennett William Skowronek (born June 27, 1997) is an American football wide receiver for the Los Angeles Rams of the National Football League (NFL). He played college football at Northwestern and Notre Dame, and was drafted by the Rams in the seventh round of the 2021 NFL Draft.

Early life and high school
Skowronek grew up in Fort Wayne, Indiana and attended Homestead High School. He had 42 receptions for 841 yards and 12 touchdowns in his junior season. As a senior Skowronek caught 53 passes for 805 yards and nine touchdowns and was named first-team All-Indiana and was given the positional Mr. Indiana Football award.

College career
Skowronek began his collegiate career at Northwestern. He became a starter going into his sophomore year and finished the season with 45 catches for 644 yards and five touchdowns. Skowronek recorded 45 reception for 562 yards and two touchdowns in his junior season. He caught 12 passes for 141 yards in three games as a senior before suffering a season-ending leg injury and taking a medical redshirt.

Following the end of his senior season, Skowronek announced he would be transferring to Notre Dame as a graduate student. He caught touchdown passes of 34 and 73 yards in a 45–3 win over Pittsburgh. Skowronek finished the season with 29 catches for 439 yards and five touchdowns while also rushing for a touchdown.

Statistics

Professional career

Skowronek was drafted by the Los Angeles Rams in the seventh round, 249th overall, of the 2021 NFL Draft. On May 16, 2021, he signed his four-year rookie contract with Los Angeles. As a rookie, he appeared in 14 games and had one start. He finished with 11 receptions for 133 receiving yards. In Super Bowl LVI, Skowronek had two receptions for 12 yards in the 23-20 victory against the Cincinnati Bengals. 

In his second season in the NFL in 2022, Rams head coach Sean McVay began using Skowronek as a fullback in addition to his role as a wide receiver. In a Week 6 win against the Carolina Panthers, Skowronek had a 19-yard reception lining up as at fullback. In that game, Skowronek also had a 17-yard rushing touchdown, which was also the first touchdown of his career. In a 17-16 win over the Las Vegas Raiders in Week 14, Skowronek led the Rams with seven catches and 89 receiving yards. In the 2022 season, he appeared in 14 games, of which he started 11. He finished with 39	receptions for 376 receiving yards and one rushing touchdown.

NFL career statistics

Personal life
Skowronek has distant Polish roots, and is distantly related to the 1947 Heisman Trophy winner Johnny Lujack. He is a cousin of the Olympic gymnast Courtney Kupets, and former NFL quarterback Trent Green is an uncle by marriage.

References

External links

Los Angeles Rams bio
Northwestern Wildcats bio
Notre Dame Fighting Irish bio

1997 births
Living people
Players of American football from Fort Wayne, Indiana
American football wide receivers
American people of Polish descent
Northwestern Wildcats football players
Notre Dame Fighting Irish football players
Los Angeles Rams players